ACM Syrian Collegiate Programming Contest (abbreviated as ACM-SCPC or SCPC) is an annual multi-tiered competitive programming competition among the universities of Syria and it's a qualifying round to the ACM Arabian Collegiate Programming Contest (ACPC). Winners of the SCPC qualify to the ACPC Finals. It is usually held in July of each year. Headquartered at SCS Syrian Computer Society. The SCPC operates in autonomous cities in Syria under the auspices of the ICPC Foundation in accordance with the ACPC Policies and Procedures.

History
The SCPC traces its roots to a competition held at SCS Syrian Computer Society in 2011. Then, it was also hosted at SCS Syrian Computer Society in 2012 and 2013. In 2014, it was co-hosted by Damascus and Tishreen University. In 2015, it was hosted at Tishreen University. In 2016, it was hosted by the Higher Institute of Applied Sciences and Technology. In 2017, it was hosted by the Syrian Virtual University.

Latest (RIP English) SCPC Standings 

 SCPC 2017 First 10 places

See also 
 ACM Student Research Competition
 Competitive programming, a type of mind sport involved in programming competitions
 International Collegiate Programming Contest
 Online judge, a service to practice for programming contests and run them online
 PC², the Programming Contest Control System in support of Computer Programming Contest activities (used at ICPC World Finals until 2008)

References

External links
 Official Website of the ACM-SCPC 
 Official Website of the ACM-ICPC - maintained at Baylor University.
 ACM-ICPC Live Archive - maintained at Baylor University.
 ACM-SCPC - Facebook

Programming contests